Sedney is a surname. Notable people with the surname include:

Jules Sedney (1922–2020), Surinamese politician
Naomi Sedney (born 1994), Dutch sprinter
Zoë Sedney (born 2001), Dutch athlete